Loisingha (Sl. No.: 66) is a Vidhan Sabha constituency of Balangir district, Odisha.

This constituency includes Loisingha block, Puintala block and Agalpur block.

In 2019 election, Bharatiya Janata Party's candidate Dr.Mukesh Mahaling won by 13668 more votes from Biju Janata Dal's candidate Pradeep Kumar Behera.

In 2009 election, Biju Janata Dal candidate Ramakanta Seth defeated Indian National Congress candidate Pandava Chandra Kumbhar by a margin of 4,093 votes.

Elected members

Fourteen elections were held between 1957 and 2014.
Elected members from the Loisingha constituency are:
2019: (66): Dr.Mukesh Mahaling (BJP)
2014: (66): Jogendra Behera (BJD)
2009: (66): Ramakanta Seth (BJD)
2004: (110): Narasingha Mishra (Congress) 
2000: (110): Balgopal Mishra (BJP)
1995: (110): Balgopal Mishra (Independent)
1990: (110): Narasingha Mishra (Janata Dal)
1985: (110): Balgopal Mishra (Independent)
1980: (110): Balgopal Mishra (Independent)
1977: (110): Ram Prasad Misra (Janata Party)
1974: (110): Ananga Udaya Singh Deo (Swatantra Party)
1971: (104): Nandakishore Misra (Swatantra Party)
1967: (104): Nandakishore Misra (Swatantra Party)
1961: (45): Ram Prasad Misra (Ganatantra Parishad)
1957: (32): Ram Prasad Misra (Ganatantra Parishad)

2019 election result

2014 election result
In 2014 election, Biju Janata Dal candidate Jogendra Behera defeated Indian National Congress candidate Pandaba Chandra Kumbhar by a margin of 22,854 votes.

Summary of results of the 2009 election

Notes

References

Assembly constituencies of Odisha
Balangir district